White Center (Yellow, Pink and Lavender on Rose) is an abstract painting by Mark Rothko completed in 1950.

2007 sale
The painting was bought in 1960 by Eliza Bliss Parkinson (the niece of  Lillie P. Bliss, one of the founders of the Museum of Modern Art) from the Sidney Janis Gallery, New York before being bought in June 1960 by David Rockefeller.

The work was sold in May 2007 by Sotheby's on behalf of David Rockefeller to the Royal family of Qatar; Sheikh Hamad bin Khalifa Al-Thani, and his wife, Mozah bint Nasser Al Missned. The painting sold for 72.84 million (USD), then setting the record of the current most expensive post-war work of art sold at auction.

Description
White Center is part of Rothko's signature multiform style: several blocks of layered, complementary colors on a large canvas.

The painting is from top to bottom, a yellow horizontal rectangle, a black horizontal strip, a narrow white rectangular band and the bottom half is lavender. The top half of the rose ground is deeper in colour and the bottom half is pale. It measures 205.8 × 141 cm.

See also
 List of most expensive paintings

References

External links
Mark Rothko at Washington's National Gallery of Art
Sale of the Painting

Modern paintings
Paintings by Mark Rothko
1950 paintings